In spatial statistics the theoretical variogram, denoted  , is a function describing the degree of spatial dependence of a spatial random field or stochastic process . The semivariogram  is half the variogram.

In the case of a concrete example from the field of gold mining, a variogram will give a measure of how much two samples taken from the mining area will vary in gold percentage depending on the distance between those samples. Samples taken far apart will vary more than samples taken close to each other.

Definition

The semivariogram  was first defined by Matheron (1963) as half the average squared difference between the values at points ( and ) separated at distance . Formally

The triple integral is over 3 dimensions.  is the separation distance (e.g., in meters or km) of interest. 
For example, the value  could represent the iron content in soil, at some location  (with geographic coordinates of latitude, longitude, and elevation) over some region  with element of volume .
To obtain the semivariogram for a given , all pairs of points at that exact distance would be sampled. In practice it is impossible to sample everywhere, so the empirical variogram is used instead.

In the case of a stationary process, the variogram and semivariogram can be represented as a function  of the difference  between locations only, by the following relation (Cressie 1993):

If the process is furthermore isotropic, then the variogram and semivariogram can be represented by a function  of the distance   only (Cressie 1993):

The terms are used for all three forms of the function. Moreover, the term "variogram" is sometimes used to denote the semivariogram, and the symbol  is sometimes used for the variogram, which brings some confusion.

Properties
According to (Cressie 1993, Chiles and Delfiner 1999, Wackernagel 2003) the theoretical variogram has the following properties:
 The semivariogram is nonnegative , since it is the expectation of a square.
 The semivariogram   at distance 0  is always 0, since .

 If the covariance function of a stationary process exists it is related to variogram by
 If a stationary random field has no spatial dependence (i.e.  if ), the semivariogram is the constant  everywhere except at the origin, where it is zero.  
  is a symmetric function.
 Consequently,  is an even function.
 If the random field is stationary and ergodic, the  corresponds to the variance of the field. The limit of the semivariogram is also called its sill.
 As a consequence the semivariogram might be non continuous only at the origin. The height of the jump at the origin is sometimes referred to as nugget or nugget effect.

Parameters

In summary, the following parameters are often used to describe variograms:

 nugget : The height of the jump of the semivariogram at the discontinuity at the origin. 
 sill : Limit of the variogram tending to infinity lag distances.  
 range : The distance in which the difference of the variogram from the sill becomes negligible. In models with a fixed sill, it is the distance at which this is first reached; for models with an asymptotic sill, it is conventionally taken to be the distance when the semivariance first reaches 95% of the sill.

Empirical variogram

Generally, an empirical variogram is needed for measured data, because sample information  is not available for every location. The sample information for example could be concentration of iron in soil samples, or pixel intensity on a camera. In the case of the iron in soil, the sample space could be 3 dimensional. If there is temporal variability as well (e.g., phosphorus content in a lake) then  could be a 4 dimensional vector . For the case where dimensions have different units (e.g., distance and time) then a scaling factor  can be applied to each to obtain a modified Euclidean distance.

Sample observations are denoted . Samples may be taken at  total different locations. This would provide as set of samples  at locations . Generally, plots show the semivariogram values as a function of sample point separation . Then, the empirical semivariogram  can be calculated for each bin:

These form the set of points . Then for each pair of points , the square of the difference in the observation (e.g., soil sample content or pixel intensity) is found. These squared differences are added together and normalized by the natural number . By definition the result is divided by 2 for the semivariogram at this separation.

For computational speed, only the unique pairs of points are needed. For example, for 2 observations pairs [] taken from locations with separation  only [] need to be considered, as the pairs [] do not provide any additional information.

Variogram models

The empirical variogram cannot be computed at every lag distance  and due to variation in the estimation it is not ensured that it is a valid variogram, as defined above. However some Geostatistical methods such as kriging need valid semivariograms. In applied geostatistics the empirical variograms are thus often approximated by model function ensuring validity (Chiles&Delfiner 1999). Some important models are (Chiles&Delfiner 1999, Cressie 1993):

 The exponential variogram model
 
 The spherical variogram model
 
 The Gaussian variogram model
 

The parameter  has different values in different references, due to the ambiguity in the definition of the range. E.g.  is the value used in (Chiles&Delfiner 1999). The  function is 1 if  and 0 otherwise.

Discussion

Three functions are used in geostatistics for describing the spatial or the temporal correlation of observations: these are the correlogram, the covariance and the semivariogram. The last is also more simply called variogram.

The variogram is the key function in geostatistics as it will be used to fit a model of the temporal/spatial correlation of the observed phenomenon. One is thus making a distinction between the experimental variogram that is a visualisation of a possible spatial/temporal correlation and the variogram model that is further used to define the weights of the kriging function. Note that the experimental variogram is an empirical estimate of the covariance of a Gaussian process. As such, it may not be positive definite and hence not directly usable in kriging, without constraints or further processing. This explains why only a limited number of variogram models are used: most commonly, the linear, the spherical, the Gaussian and the exponential models.

Applications
The empirical variogram is used in geostatistics as a first estimate of the variogram model needed for spatial interpolation by kriging. 

 Empirical variograms for the spatiotemporal variability of column-averaged carbon dioxide was used to determine coincidence criteria for satellite and ground-based measurements.
 Empirical variograms were calculated for the density of a heterogeneous material (Gilsocarbon).
Empirical variograms are calculated from observations of strong ground motion from earthquakes. These models are used for seismic risk and loss assessments of spatially-distributed infrastructure.

Related concepts

The squared term in the variogram, for instance , can be replaced with different powers: A madogram is defined with the absolute difference, and a rodogram is defined with the square root of the absolute difference, . Estimators based on these lower powers are said to be more resistant to outliers. They can be generalized as a "variogram of order α",

,

in which a variogram is of order 2, a madogram is a variogram of order 1, and a rodogram is a variogram of order 0.5.

When a variogram is used to describe the correlation of different variables it is called cross-variogram. Cross-variograms are used in co-kriging.
Should the variable be binary or represent classes of values, one is then talking about indicator variograms. Indicator variogram is used in indicator kriging.

References

Further reading
 Cressie, N., 1993, Statistics for spatial data, Wiley Interscience.
 Chiles, J. P., P. Delfiner, 1999, Geostatistics, Modelling Spatial Uncertainty, Wiley-Interscience.
 Wackernagel, H., 2003, Multivariate Geostatistics, Springer.
 Burrough, P. A. and McDonnell, R. A., 1998, Principles of Geographical Information Systems.
 Isobel Clark, 1979, Practical Geostatistics, Applied Science Publishers.
 Clark, I., 1979, Practical Geostatistics, Applied Science Publishers.
 David, M., 1978, Geostatistical Ore Reserve Estimation, Elsevier Publishing.
 Hald, A., 1952, Statistical Theory with Engineering Applications, John Wiley & Sons, New York.
 Journel, A. G. and Huijbregts, Ch. J., 1978 Mining Geostatistics, Academic Press.
 Glass, H.J., 2003, Method for assessing quality of the variogram, The Journal of The South African Institute of Mining and Metallurgy.

External links
 AI-GEOSTATS: an educational resource about geostatistics and spatial statistics
 Geostatistics: Lecture by Rudolf Dutter at the Technical University of Vienna

Geostatistics
Statistical deviation and dispersion
Spatial processes